"Summarize" is the first single released from Australian indie rock band Little Birdy's third studio album, Confetti. It was released on 10 April 2009 and the single made it to number 54 on the ARIA charts.

Two versions were released: a CD single featuring the track "One in a Million", and an iTunes version which featured the track "Sorrow" instead. Additionally, the song "Brother" was moved from Track 5 (CD) to Track 4 (iTunes).

Track listing

Charts

Release history

References

2009 singles
Little Birdy songs
2009 songs
Eleven: A Music Company singles
Songs written by Katy Steele